The Addams Family is an American animated television series produced by Hanna-Barbera Productions and based on the eponymous comic strip characters by Charles Addams. It is the second cartoon show to feature the characters (the first was the 1973 series, also produced by Hanna-Barbera), and ran from September 12, 1992, to November 6, 1993, on ABC. The series' development began in the wake of the successful 1991 Addams Family feature film. Two seasons were produced.

Premise
The series focuses on the Addams Family at their ancestral home in the fictional town of Happydale Heights. Much of the plot lines focus on mostly the family dealing with an issue concerning their lives, which they seek to resolve. In some stories, the Addams find themselves dealing with the Normanmeyer family who seek to exploit their situation or thwart their schemes in order to be rid of them from the town; the exception being the family's only son, who is friends with the Addams children. Most episodes focus on a single story that concludes with the Addams celebrating their success with a family dance.

As with the 1973 series, the macabre nature of the Addams family was toned down in order to be acceptable for children. An example of this is Gomez's love of cigars not being shown, along with his response to his wife's use of foreign languages being reduced to a mere kissing frenzy. In additional, writers also ensured that the plots for episodes followed a similar nature to those written for other Saturday morning cartoons of the period.

Cast

 John Astin as Gomez Addams - The actor reprised his role from the 1960s TV series
 Nancy Linari as Morticia Frump Addams
 Debi Derryberry as Wednesday Addams
 Jeannie Elias as Pugsley Addams
 Rip Taylor as Uncle Fester
 Carol Channing as Granny Frump
 Jim Cummings as Lurch - The actor also voiced several other minor characters in the series
 Pat Fraley as Cousin Itt
 Rob Paulsen as Norman Normanmeyer - The actor based on the character's voice on an impersonation of Paul Lynde
 Edie McClurg as Normina Normanmeyer
 Dick Beals as Norman "N.J." Normanmeyer Jr.

Additional voices were provided by Ernest Harada, Susan Silo, Pamela Segall, Marcia Wallace, and Héctor Elizondo

Production
New artistic models of the characters were used for this series, though still having a passing resemblance to the original comics. Lurch, for instance, has blue skin in the animated series. The Addams Family Theme, re-recorded with a basso profondo lead vocal, was reused as the theme for the series.

Episodes

Season 1 (1992)

Season 2 (1993)

Merchandise
Playmates Toys produced a series of nine action figures based on the Addams Family animated series. This includes Gomez, Morticia, Uncle Fester, Lurch, Pugsley, and Granny among others. Each figure includes multiple points of articulation, accessories, and a biography card on their cardback. No commercial was ever made for this. Books were also produced.

Notes

References

External links
 

1990s American animated television series
1990s American horror comedy television series
1992 American television series debuts
1993 American television series endings
American children's animated comedy television series
American children's animated fantasy television series
American children's animated horror television series
Television series by Hanna-Barbera
The Addams Family television series
Animated television series about families
Witchcraft in television
Animated television series reboots
American Broadcasting Company original programming
English-language television shows